Karola Sube (later Ziesche, born 28 April 1964 in Berlin) is a German gymnast and competed for the SC Dynamo Berlin / Sportvereinigung (SV) Dynamo. She won medals at international competitions.

References 

1964 births
German female artistic gymnasts
Living people
Olympic medalists in gymnastics
Medalists at the 1980 Summer Olympics
Olympic bronze medalists for East Germany
Gymnasts at the 1980 Summer Olympics
Olympic gymnasts of East Germany